Kenneth McKinnon House, also known as the McKinnon-McArthur-Kinlaw-Johnson House, is a historic home located near St. Pauls, Robeson County, North Carolina.  It was built about 1840, and is a two-story, timber frame dwelling with Greek Revival style interior design elements.  It rests on a brick pier foundation, has a side-gable roof, and exterior end chimneys.  At the rear is a one-story end-gable kitchen/dining room addition.  The front facade features an overhanging second story, thereby creating a full-width, recessed first-story porch.

It was added to the National Register of Historic Places in 2005.

References

Houses on the National Register of Historic Places in North Carolina
Greek Revival houses in North Carolina
Houses completed in 1840
Houses in Robeson County, North Carolina
National Register of Historic Places in Robeson County, North Carolina